Seth Bomanjee Dinshaw Petit (27 March 1859 – 17 December 1915) was son of Sir Dinshaw Maneckjee Petit, Bart, and a noted cotton mill owner and philanthropist from Bombay.

He was born on 27 March 1859 and was the third son of Sir Dinshaw Maneckjee Petit. He inherited a large portion of his father's estate and was owner of Petit Mills. He was one of the founders of the London School of Tropical Medicine to which he donated £6,666. In a letter to Sir Francis Lovell (Dean of the School), quoted in The Times in 1902, he wrote the following about the school:

He was the president of the Mill Owners' Association; a director of  Bank of Bombay for ten years and served as its president in 1903. He founded the Bomanjee Dinshaw Petit Parsee General Hospital and served as its president for many years. He was father of Jehangir Bomanji Petit, who impressed on him to make the munificent donation of the property called Cumballa Hotel at Cumballa; this led to the foundation of Bomanjee Dinshaw Petit Parsee General Hospital in 1907. He was on the board of the Victoria Jubilee Technical Institute, vice-president of Bombay Presidency Association, and founder and managing director of the newspaper Indian Daily Mail.

He died on 17 December 1915.

References

1859 births
1915 deaths
Parsi people from Mumbai
Founders of Indian schools and colleges
Indian businesspeople in textiles
Businesspeople from Mumbai
Indian newspaper founders
19th-century Indian philanthropists
Indian bankers